Huang Lei (Born December 6, 1971) is a Chinese actor, director, singer and screenwriter. He was born in Nanchang, Jiangxi, and now lives in Beijing.

Huang ranked 58th on Forbes China Celebrity 100 list in 2015, 29th in 2017, and 76th in 2019. 62nd in 2017, and 63rd in 2019.

Experience
In 1990, Huang entered into the Acting Department of Beijing Film Academy; four years later, he entered into the institute of the Department of Film Performances, specialising in movie performance. When he graduated in 1997, he stayed in the Beijing Film Academy as a teacher. At the same year, he published the first music album Life on a String. In 1999, he starred in the TV show April Rhapsody, as Xuzhimo. In 2004, he published his first book The Fantasy of Seventeen Floor. In 2006, he starred in the drama Secret Love In Peach Blossom Land.

Personal life
Huang and actress Li Sun had been in love since she was a freshman and he was a lecturer at Beijing Film Academy. They registered their marriage and held a small ceremony with close friends and relatives in 2004. They welcomed 2 daughters (born in 2006 and 2013) and 1 son (born in 2017). In 2016, they took wedding pictures and had a grand wedding ceremony with distinguished guests and celebrities in Chinese showbiz to mark their 20 years together.

Huang and his eldest daughter starred in the variety show Where Are We Going, Dad? (Chinese version) in 2014.

Bibliography

Writing
 My Shoulders, Their Wings (2014) 
 The Fantasy of Seventeen Floor (2003)
Private Recipes of Huang Lei (2016)

Stage

Music Album

Dubbing Work

Filmography

Variety Shows

Awards

References

External links
 
 Huang Lei at chinesemov.com
 https://web.archive.org/web/20120425161406/http://et.21cn.com/topic/tv/ssnh/
 http://www.yinyuetai.com/fanclub/2344
 http://www.youku.com/star_page/uid_UNzAzMjg=.html
https://movie.douban.com/celebrity/1037715/
http://people.mtime.com/990670/
http://hkmdb.com/db/people/view.mhtml?id=9479&display_set=big5
http://www.bfa.edu.cn/yx/2013-06/19/content_21907.htm

1971 births
Male actors from Jiangxi
Living people
People from Nanchang
Screenwriters from Jiangxi
People's Republic of China writers
Singers from Jiangxi
20th-century Chinese male actors
21st-century Chinese male actors
Chinese male film actors
Chinese male television actors
21st-century Chinese male singers